KF Egnatia, also known as Egnatia Rrogozhinë, is an Albanian football club based in Rrogozhinë. They play their home games at Rrogozhinë Stadium, which has a capacity of 4000 spectators.

The club was founded on 15 September 1934 under the name 22 Shtatori Rrogozhinë, and in 1991, the name of the club was changed to Vullneti Rrogozhinë, before renaming to its current name KS Egnatia Rrogozhinë in 1998.

History
The passion and desire for the game of football was integrated into the hearts of local citizens and patriots since the early years of World War I. Rrogozhinë being neighbours to Kavajë, a city with a long tradition in football on a national level knew how to use this experience to its own advantage by forming initially an amateur level team which would later go on to compete in the second division of Albanian football. The very first match in club history was a friendly between Besa in 1934 which ended in a 1–7 loss. Mustafa Cara, a student of agronomy in Bari, Italy who had returned home for vacation (he was a player for Fidelis Andria, a Serie B club in Italy at the time), scored 5 goals for Besa.

Following the liberation of the country after World War II, the league structure changed by allowing only district level teams to compete in the top two divisions. This made it difficult for Rrogozhinë, a locality at the time, to compete on a national level.

Egnatia had one season in the top tier of Albanian football after winning promotion in summer 2004. They were only relegated on the first attempt, with Alfred Ferko succeeding Hysen Dedja and Petrit Haxhia as first team coach during the season.

In May 2021 Egnatia was promoted to the Albanian Superliga, for the second time in their history.

Players

First-team squad

Personnel

Current technical staff

Management

Managerial history
{|
|- valign="top"
|

See also
 Besa Kavajë
 Kastrioti

References

Football clubs in Albania
Association football clubs established in 1934
Rrogozhinë
Kategoria e Dytë clubs
KF Egnatia